Sixth Avenue MRT station is an underground Mass Rapid Transit (MRT) station on the Downtown line in Bukit Timah, Singapore.

History
Contract 917 was awarded for the Design and Construction of Sixth Avenue and King Albert Park stations and tunnels at S$320.7 million. The main contractor for the station Alpine Bau went bankrupt in mid-2013. Subsequently, completion of the station was handed over to McConnell Dowell under Contract 917A. On 28 June 2015, Transport Minister Lui Tuck Yew announced that the delay was "completely resolved" by the authorities and Stage 2's opening date was reverted to 27 December that year.

Station details
Sixth Avenue's name was retained from its working name in July 2008, and was selected through a public poll in July 2009, which also included the names "Eng Neo" and "Bukit Timah".

The station is the only Downtown line station not to feature public art as part of the Art in Transit Programme.

Location

The station is located along Bukit Timah Road underneath the traffic junctions with Eng Neo Avenue and Fourth Avenue. It was described by the media as the first MRT station to be located within a private residential area. Directly overhead, it serves Fifth Avenue Condo, Guthrie House, Royalville, Second Avenue Junction, Sixth Avenue Centre, Sixth Avenue Ville, Soo's Nursing Home, while across Dunearn Road, it serves Eton House Pre-School, Jalan Naga Sari, Nanyang Girls’ High School and Vanda Estate. In addition, the nearby Grandstand (Old Turf City) is slated for future developments.

References

Railway stations in Singapore opened in 2015
Bukit Timah
Mass Rapid Transit (Singapore) stations